Jay A. Tilden is an American civil servant who serves as the most senior federal leader of the Nuclear Emergency Support Team (NEST) within the Department of Energy / National Nuclear Security Administration (DOE/NNSA).

Professional career 
Since 2016, Jay Tilden has served as DOE/NNSA's Deputy Under Secretary and Associate Administrator for Counterterrorism and Counterproliferation, with responsibility to prepare for and respond to nuclear and radiological accidents and incidents worldwide.

Tilden is an advocate for strengthening U.S. nuclear forensics capabilities and expanding their application to state-based threats. Writing in the journal The National Interest, Tilden argues forensic capabilities can help attribute or resolve ambiguities about various “unattributed nuclear events,” including "undisclosed accidents at civil or military nuclear facilities, nuclear weapon mishaps in denied geographic areas, or perhaps even an accidental nuclear detonation. Other ambiguous scenarios may involve a state’s limited use of nuclear weapons in a regional conflict and subsequent denial thereof or an attempt to blame a clandestine nuclear attack on non-state actors."

Education 

Tilden graduated from the University of Maryland in 1990 and completed post-graduate studies in strategic intelligence from the Defense Intelligence Agency's Joint Military Intelligence College in 1999. He completed the Harvard Kennedy School's Senior Executive Fellows course in 2013 as well as the Department of Defense's CAPSTONE program in 2018.

References 

Living people